Le Roy, New York is the  name of two locations in Genesee County, New York: 

Le Roy (village), New York
Le Roy (town), New York